Carlo Damman (born 18 March 1993) is a Belgian footballer who currently plays for Knokke in the Belgian Second Amateur Division as a right-back.

Career

Knokke
Having played for KSV Roeselare since 2013, Damman's contract was terminated by mutual agreement on 6 November 2019. He then joined R. Knokke F.C. on 3 February 2020 on a deal until the summer 2021.

References

External links

1993 births
Living people
Belgian footballers
Association football defenders
K.S.V. Roeselare players
Challenger Pro League players